The 1908-09 French Rugby Union Championship was won by SBUC that beat Stade Toulousain  in the final.

Semifinals

Final 

 Stade Toulousain: Louis Ramondou, Jean Julien Gaston Serisey, André Perrens, Octave Lery, Henri Avejean, Hector Tallavignes, Maurice Fouchou, Pierre Mounicq, François-Xavier Dutour, André Moulines, Adrien Bouey, Jean Laguionie, Auguste Fabregat, Augustin Pujol, Joseph Séverat

SBUC: Augustin Hordebaigt, Marc Giacardy, Marcel Laffitte, Alphonse Massé, Hélier Thil, Robert Monier, Herman Droz, Robert Blanchard, Delaye, J.Tachoires, Maurice Leuvielle, Fernand Perrens, Maurice Bruneau, Hunter, Henri Martin

Sources 
La Croix, 1909

External links
 Compte rendu de la finale de 1909, sur lnr.fr

1909
France
Championship